Slovenia is divided in eight national constituencies, and two special constituencies, for elections of representatives of national minorities (Italian and Hungarian). Each of the eight constituencies has approximately 200,000 voters. Each constituency consists of eleven electoral districts, and eleven MPs are elected from each constituency, although not necessary one in each of the electoral districts.

List of constituencies and districts

Elections in Slovenia